Abdul Baten is a Bangladesh Nationalist Party politician and the former Member of Parliament of Patuakhali-4.

Career
Baten was elected to parliament from Patuakhali-4 as a Bangladesh Nationalist Party candidate in 1979.

References

Bangladesh Nationalist Party politicians
Living people
2nd Jatiya Sangsad members
Year of birth missing (living people)